Goodness TV is a 24-hour Indian satellite channel, airing Christian spiritual programs. The channel airs programs in Malayalam and English. The channel is owned and managed by Goodness Media Private Limited. Goodness Media Private Limited is a registered company started in the year 2010.

Satellite details

See also
Catholic television
Catholic television channels
Catholic television networks

References

Malayalam-language television channels
Catholic television channels
Religious television channels in India
Television channels and stations established in 2010
Television stations in Kochi